In two-or-more-player sequential games, a ply is one turn taken by one of the players.  The word is used to clarify what is meant when one might otherwise say "turn".

The word "turn" can be a problem since it means different things in different traditions.  For example, in standard chess terminology, one move consists of a turn by each player; therefore a ply in chess is a half-move. Thus, after 20 moves in a chess game, 40 plies have been completed—20 by white and 20 by black.  In the game of Go, by contrast, a ply is the normal unit of counting moves; so for example to say that a game is 250 moves long is to imply 250 plies.

The word "ply" used as a synonym for "layer" goes back to the 15th century. Arthur Samuel first used the term in its game-theoretic sense in his seminal paper on machine learning in checkers in 1959, but with a slightly different meaning: the "ply", in Samuel's terminology, is actually the depth of analysis ("Certain expressions were  introduced  which we will find useful.  These are: Ply, defined as  the number of moves ahead, where a ply  of  two  consists of one  proposed move  by the machine and  one anticipated  reply by the opponent").

In computing, the concept of a ply is important because one ply corresponds to one level of the game tree.   The Deep Blue chess computer which defeated Kasparov in 1997 would typically search to a depth of between six and sixteen plies to a maximum of forty plies in some situations.

See also
Minimax algorithm

References

Further reading

External links

Chess terminology
Game artificial intelligence
Game theory